Classical swine fever (CSF) or hog cholera (also sometimes called pig plague based on the German word ) is a highly contagious disease of swine (Old World and New World pigs). It has been mentioned as a potential bioweapon.

Clinical signs
Swine fever causes fever, skin lesions, convulsions, splenic infarctions and usually (particularly in young animals) death within 15 days.

The disease has acute and chronic forms, and can range from severe, with high mortality, to mild or even unapparent.

In the acute form of the disease, in all age groups, there is fever, huddling of sick animals, loss of appetite, dullness, weakness, conjunctivitis, constipation followed by diarrhoea, and an unsteady gait. Several days after the onset of clinical signs, the ears, abdomen and inner thighs may show a purple discoloration. Animals with acute disease die within 1–2 weeks. Severe cases of the disease appear very similar to African swine fever. With low-virulence strains, the only expression may be poor reproductive performance and the birth of piglets with neurologic defects such as congenital tremor.

Immunization
A small fraction of the infected pigs may survive and are rendered immune. Artificial immunization procedures were first developed by Marion Dorset.

Epidemiology
The disease is endemic in much of Asia, [Central and South America, and parts of Europe and Africa. It was believed to have been eradicated in the United Kingdom by 1966 (according to the Department for Environment, Food and Rural Affairs), but an outbreak occurred in East Anglia in 2000.  On January 31, 1978 USDA Secretary Bob Bergland declared that the United States was free of the disease. The appearance of CSF in Italy and Spain was traced by in a retroactive genetic analysis. Greiser-Wilke et al., 2000 traced these to shipments of piglets from the Netherlands.

Other regions believed free of CSF include Australia, Belgium (1998), Canada (1962), Ireland, New Zealand, and Scandinavia.

Virus

The infectious agent responsible is a virus CSFV (previously called hog cholera virus) of the genus Pestivirus in the family Flaviviridae. CSFV is closely related to the ruminant pestiviruses that cause bovine viral diarrhoea  and border disease.

The effect of different CSFV strains varies widely, leading to a wide range of clinical signs. Highly virulent strains correlate with acute, obvious disease and high mortality, including neurological signs and hemorrages within the skin.

Less virulent strains can give rise to subacute or chronic infections that may escape detection, while still causing abortions and stillbirths. In these cases, herds in high-risk areas are usually serologically tested on a thorough statistical basis.

Infected piglets born to infected but subclinical sows help maintain the disease within a population. Other signs can include lethargy, fever, immunosuppression, chronic diarrhoea, and secondary respiratory infections. The incubation period of CSF ranges from 2 to 14 days, but clinical signs may not be apparent until after 2 to 3 weeks. Preventive state regulations usually assume 21 days as the outside limit of the incubation period. Animals with an acute infection can survive 2 to 3 months before their eventual death.

Eradicating CSF is problematic. Current programmes revolve around rapid detection, diagnosis, and slaughter. This may possibly be followed by emergency vaccination (ATCvet codes:  for the inactivated viral vaccine,  for the live vaccine). Vaccination is only used where the virus is widespread in the domestic pig population and/or in wild or feral pigs. In the latter case, a slaughter policy alone is usually impracticable. Instead, countries within the EU have implemented hunting restrictions designed to limit the movement of infected boars, as well as using marker and emergency vaccines to inhibit the spread of infection. Possible sources for maintaining and introducing infection include the wide transport of pigs and pork products, as well as endemic CSF within wild boar and feral pig populations.

Strains 
 1 including 1.1, 1.2, 1.3, 1.4, the unassigned 1.x
 2 including 2.1, 2.2, 2.3
 3 including 3.1, 3.2, 3.3, 3.4

Diagnosis

Standard diagnostic tests include: 
 Fluorescent antibody test (FAT)  detection of viral protein using fluorescent labelled antibodies in tissue
 Serum Enzyme-linked-immunosorbent assay (ELISA) detection of host animal antibody response in serum samples.
 Antigen ELISA detection of viral protein (antigen) in serum samples.
 RT-qPCR test detection of viral RNA in samples, especially useful to differentiate strains. Direct genetic typing for CSF was first developed by Greiser-Wilke et al., 2000 to trace descendants of the 1997-1998 EU epizootic.
 Virus isolation isolation of virus in cell culture.

Histopathological examination:
 Histology of the brain shows vasculoendothelial proliferation and perivascular cuffing (cuffing is highly suggestive when accompanied by other signs, but is not pathognomonic for the disease).

See also
 2007 Central Luzon hog cholera outbreak
 Animal viruses

References

External links

 CSF page of Pig Disease Information Centre (UK)
 Current status of Classical Swine Fever worldwide at OIE. WAHID Interface – OIE World Animal Health Information Database
 Technical Disease card, World Organisation for Animal Health
 European Commission Animal Health & Welfare on CSF
  Classical swine fever: how to spot and report the disease, United Kingdom Department for Environment, Food & Rural Affairs
 Animal and Plant Health Inspection Service: Classical Swine Fever, United States Department of Agriculture
 Hog cholera ravaged countryside in 1913 – Pantagraph (Bloomington, Illinois newspaper)
 Center for Food Security and Public Health: Classical Swine Fever, Iowa State University
 Species Profile – Classical Swine Fever, National Invasive Species Information Center, United States National Agricultural Library.

Swine diseases
Animal viral diseases
Pestiviruses
Biological anti-agriculture weapons
Flaviviridae